Salinas Valley State Prison (SVSP) is a  California state prison located  north of Soledad, in Monterey County, California, adjacent to the Correctional Training Facility (aka Soledad State Prison).

Facilities

The prison consists of five facilities: A, B, C, D, and M. Of the five, Facility A, D, and M house Sensitive Needs Yard (SNY) inmates. The surrounding housing units hold level-4 and level-3 inmates, the two highest security rankings. M yard is a level-1 yard which houses approximately 200 inmates.

The prison had a gymnasium which, due to the prison's over-crowding, at one time had been converted into a dormitory but due to inmate population reductions was shut down around 2008.

The prison also houses an inpatient mental health program, formerly operated under the auspices of the California Department of State Hospitals (Salinas Valley Psychiatric Inpatient Program) to accommodate the psychological needs of inmates.

As of July 31, 2022, SVSP was incarcerating people at 102.5% of its design capacity, with 2,941 occupants.

Notable prisoners
 
 Big Lurch - American Rapper.
 Efren Saldivar
 Robert Peernock
 Joe Son
 Hans Reiser, Linux Kernel programmer
 Terry Childs
 Aariel Maynor
 Roy Charles Waller

See also

References

External links
 Salinas Valley State Prison Official webpage
 California Department of Corrections and Rehabilitation Official website
 

1996 establishments in California
Buildings and structures in Monterey County, California
Prisons in California
Salinas Valley